John (died after 1221) was a Hungarian Catholic prelate in the 13th century, who served as Bishop of Nyitra (today Nitra, Slovakia) at least from 1204 to 1221.

Career
John was elected as bishop sometime between 1198 (when his predecessor Everard is last mentioned) and 1204 (when he first appears in this dignity).

During the 1204–1205 controversial election of the Archbishop of Esztergom, John was among the four prelates – alongside Kalán of Pécs, Boleslaus of Vác and Kalanda of Veszprém – who strongly opposed the election of John, Archbishop of Kalocsa as their new metropolitan. They jointly wrote a letter to Pope Innocent III, where they claimed the archbishops were elected jointly by the chapter and the bishops in accordance with the spirit of customary law since King St. Stephen (John was elected by the chapter, which refused to invite the bishops of the suffragan dioceses of the Archbishopric of Esztergom to participate in the election process). Subsequently, John of Nyitra, who did not recognize the legitimacy of the election as only suffragan, supported the candidacy of Kalán Bár-Kalán against John of Kalocsa. In accordance with the pope's decision favoring John of Kalocsa, the suffragans expressed to support John without reservations, while John of Nyitra was forced to write a letter to Innocent, in which he stated that he will withdraw his support from Kalán if the pope does not accept his protegee's nomination.

John bought a portion in Mita, Trencsén County in 1210, expanding the possessions of the bishopric there. John acquired lands for his diocese along the river Vág (Váh) in the following years. He bought half part of Biccse (today Bytča, Slovakia) from castle warriors in Trencsén County.

Alongside papal legate Cardinal  and Leopold VI, Duke of Austria, John mediated between King Ottokar I of Bohemia and Andrew, Bishop of Prague in their investiture controversy in 1221. The Bohemian king confirmed the lost privileges of the Diocese of Prague in June 1221, then the papal legate lifted the excommunication over the kingdom imposed by Andrew earlier. Alongside other prelates from Austria and Poland, the name of John appeared among the testimonies of Ottokar's royal charter.

John died prior to 1223, when his successor James is mentioned as the bishop of Nyitra.

References

Sources

 
 
 
 

1220s deaths
12th-century Hungarian people
13th-century Hungarian people
13th-century Roman Catholic bishops in Hungary
Medieval Hungarian diplomats
Bishops of Nitra